In knot theory, the Kinoshita–Terasaka knot is a particular prime knot. It has 11 crossings. The Kinoshita–Terasaka knot has a variety of interesting mathematical properties. It is related by mutation to the Conway knot, with which it shares a Jones polynomial. It has the same Alexander polynomial as the unknot.

References

External links
 K11n42 at Knot Atlas

Prime knots and links